This is the first edition of the event.

Ryan Agar and Adam Feeney won the title, defeating Dane Propoggia and Jose Statham 6–3, 6–4 in the final.

Seeds

Draw

Draw

References
 Main Draw

Traralgon Challenger - Doubles
2013 Doubles
2013 in Australian tennis